Xuxa Dance is the eighteenth studio album and the fourth in the Spanish by Brazilian singer and TV host Xuxa. It was produced by Christian de Walden and released in December 1996 by PolyGram in Latin America, and Mercury Records in the United States.

Production 
After the release of the album its fourth Spanish-language studio album El Pequeño Mundo (1994), the label Polygram decided to bet on an album completely different from the previous one of Xuxa. This time, the label wanted the singer to sing for the audience that had grown up with her. At the request of the label, the Italian composer and producer Christian de Walden began writing some songs for the project along with Max di Carlo and Graciela Carballo, who worked with Xuxa since their first Spanish album.

The recordings of Xuxa Dance were made in July 1996 at the Flamingo Café Recording Studio in Miami, Florida (USA), and was produced by Christian de Walden and Max di Carlo, and co-produced by Walter Clissen. They were recorded in all, 14 songs for the album, only two did not enter the final selection. Along with the project in Spanish, Xuxa recorded the Christmas music "Amém", performed in several specials of the presenter and that later would be recorded for the XSPB 9 – Magical Christmas (2009). All material was recorded in just two weeks.

Initially, the album would be released in September, scheduled for the premiere of a new Xuxa show on Telefé, an Argentine broadcaster. With the uncertainty of the project, the album was postponed to November. The album label has changed according to some countries. There are three different versions: green, pink and white. The recordings of the music videos of "Los Amigos de Mis Amigas Son Mis Amigos" and "Esto de Quererte" also took place in Miami.

The work is composed basically by compositions dance/electronic, a few ballads and a cover version of "Ilarié" which is nothing more than a remix with re-recorded vocals.

Release and reception 

Xuxa Dance was released at the end of 1996 in Latin America and United States, In Argentine in November had reached the ninth place among the most sold in that country the following month occupied the third position behind the albums Tango by Julio Iglesias, and Tropimatch by actor Sergio "EI Lobizon Del Oeste". In February 1997, Xuxa Dance had already won gold in Argentina, according to Billboard magazine.

In addition to Argentina, "Xuxa Dance" was released in Mexico shortly after, and in the U.S. where it had a slightly better repercussion than the predecessor El Pequeño Mundo, but not enough to become the album a hit.

Promotion
To promote the album, Xuxa has participated in several TV and radio programs, as well as giving interviews to newspapers and magazines from countries such as Argentina, Chile and the United States. The album commercial was broadcast throughout Latin America and the USA.

Two songs won music videos: "Los Amigos de Mis Amigas Son Mis Amigos" and "Esto de Quererte", both recorded in Miami in April 1997. Months later, Xuxa recorded a new version of the video of "Los Amigos" con Paquitas at Pink House, his old mansion in Rio de Janeiro, for a TV show.

In August 1997, Polygram released the South Beats compilation which included the remix version of "Yo te Doy mi Corazón".

In December 1997, the blonde arrived to participate in a festival in Argentina where she sang the songs of work of the album.

Track list

Personnel

Photos: André Schiliró
Costume Designer: Xuxa, Fabiana Kherlakian
Recorded at the studios: Flamingo Café Recording Studios
Studio City, Hollywood Studios S.R.L.
Enterprise Studios
Hair and Makeup: Mauro Freire
Mastering: Brian Gardner
Production: Christian de Walden, Max di Carlo
Graphic design: Patrícia Chueke, Ge Alves Pinto
Co-production: Walter Clissen

Certifications

Release history

References

External links 
 Xuxa Dance at Discogs

1996 albums
Xuxa albums
Spanish-language albums
Dance-pop albums by Brazilian artists